The Château de La Grange is an historic château in Manom, Moselle, France. It was built in the 17th century. It belonged to Jean de Bertier de Sauvigny after World War I. It has been listed as an official historical monument since February 28, 1984.

References

Châteaux in Moselle (department)
Houses completed in the 17th century
Monuments historiques of Grand Est